Viktor Sanikidze (alternate spelling: Victor) (born April 1, 1986) is a Georgian politician, former professional basketball executive and former player. He played at both the small forward and power forward positions in his entire career.

Early years
Sanikidze began his basketball career with the Academy Tbilisi youth teams in the Georgian Republic. In the 2001–02 season, Sanikidze attended and played basketball for Globe Tech Junior College in New York City. In the 2002–03 season, he returned home to Georgia, to play once again for Academy Tbilisi.

Professional career

Europe
In 2003, Sanikidze signed with SAOS JDA Dijon, a pro club in the French Pro A League and a club competing in the European fourth-tier level league, the FIBA Europe Cup (later renamed FIBA EuroCup Challenge), at the time he joined the team. JDA Dijon made the FIBA Europe Cup finals, where they lost to Mitteldeutscher, during Sanikidze's first season with the club. He spent three seasons in France (2003–04, 2004–05 and 2005–06).

Sanikidze spent the 2006–07 season with the Spanish ACB League club MMT Estudiantes, a team that was competing in the European third-tier level league, the FIBA EuroCup (later renamed to EuroChallenge), at the time he joined the team. He missed the entire the 2007–08 season due to injury.

Sanikidze joined the Estonian League club Tartu Ülikool/Rock for the 2008–09 season. Tartu Ülikool/Rock also competed in the EuroChallenge League, the third-tier level of European-wide basketball, and the regional Baltic League. In August 2009, he moved to the Italian League club Virtus Bologna. On July 11, 2012, Sanikidze signed a multi-year deal with the Italian club Montepaschi Siena.

On September 20, 2013, he signed a one-year deal with the Spanish club CAI Zaragoza. On July 31, 2014, he signed a one-year deal with the Russian VTB United League club UNICS Kazan. On August 3, 2015, Sanikidze signed with TED Ankara Kolejliler of the Turkish League.

On September 6, 2016, Sanikidze signed with the Greek club Aris Thessaloniki for the 2016–17 season.

NBA
Sanikidze was selected with the 42nd pick of the 2004 NBA draft, by the Atlanta Hawks, but his draft rights were traded the same day to the San Antonio Spurs, for a 2005 second-round pick, and cash considerations. The Spurs still hold his NBA player rights, but they have yet to sign him to a contract, and he continues to play in Europe. In July 2007, Sanikidze played for San Antonio's NBA Summer League squad, during the Rocky Mountain Revue Summer League, scoring 15 points in a Spurs loss to the Philadelphia 76ers' summer league squad.

Georgian national team
Sanikidze played with the Republic of Georgia's junior national teams. With Georgia's junior teams, he played at the 2004 FIBA Europe Under-18 Championship, and also at the 2006 FIBA Europe Under-20 Championship Division B.

He has also been a member of the senior Georgian national basketball team, and with has competed with them in the European A Division EuroBasket. With Georgia's senior team, he played at the EuroBasket 2nd Division tournaments of the EuroBasket 2007 Division B and the EuroBasket 2009 Division B.

He also played in the EuroBasket 1st Division tournaments of EuroBasket 2011, EuroBasket 2013, and EuroBasket 2015.

Basketball Executive career
On August 24, 2019, the Aris Thessaloniki announced that Sanikidze had returned as a sports director.

Political career
On September 10, 2020, Sanikidze was named the 13th number on the Georgian Dream party list for the 2020 parliamentary elections.

Since December 11, 2020, Sanikidze is a member of Parliament of Georgia, and currently serving as first deputy chairperson of the Sports and Youth Issues Committee.

Personal life
Sanikidze had a kid called Nikala.

References

External links
 Euroleague.net Profile
 Eurobasket.com Profile
 FIBA Profile
 FIBA game-center Profile
 Italian League Profile 
 Spanish League Profile 
 Greek League Profile

1986 births
Living people
Aris B.C. players
Atlanta Hawks draft picks
Basket Zaragoza players
BC UNICS players
CB Estudiantes players
Expatriate basketball people from Georgia (country) in France
Expatriate basketball people from Georgia (country) in Spain
Expatriate basketball people from Georgia (country) in the United States
Expatriate basketball people from Georgia (country) in Italy
Expatriate basketball people from Georgia (country) in Estonia
JDA Dijon Basket players
Junior college men's basketball players in the United States
Korvpalli Meistriliiga players
Lega Basket Serie A players
Liga ACB players
Men's basketball players from Georgia (country)
Mens Sana Basket players
Power forwards (basketball)
Small forwards
Basketball players from Tbilisi
Tartu Ülikool/Rock players
TED Ankara Kolejliler players
Virtus Bologna players
Expatriate basketball people from Georgia (country) in Turkey
Expatriate basketball people from Georgia (country) in Greece
Expatriate basketball people from Georgia (country) in Russia
Basketball executives
21st-century politicians from Georgia (country)
Sportsperson-politicians